Max is a 1982 novel by Howard Fast. It tells the story of a young man who leaves his humble roots on the lower east side of New York City to find success in Hollywood's earliest stages. Max has had 52 editions of publication in 10 languages.

Plot
Max is about the life of Max Britsky, a poor Jewish kid who grows up to be an entrepreneur during the infancy of the motion picture business. He eventually becomes one of the first major studio owners and one of the richest people in America. Though a shrewd businessman, his people skills leave much to be desired. Emotionally devoid, he loses his first wife through affairs with some of the starlets and secretaries that work for him. By the end of his life, he loses his studios and theaters and dies a penniless, lonely man.

References

1982 American novels
Novels by Howard Fast